Minasyan, Minasian or Minassian is an Armenian surname. 

Notable people with the surname include:

Minasyan
Arthur Minasyan (footballer, born 1977), Armenian footballer
Arthur Minasyan (footballer, born 1978), Armenian footballer
Gor Minasyan (born 1994), Armenian weightlifter
Mayis Minasyan (born 1951), Armenian-Iranian footballer

Vahagn Minasyan (born 1985), Armenian footballer
Vardan Minasyan (born 1974), Armenian footballer and manager

Minasian
Arsen Minasian, Armenian-Iranian physician
Artashes Minasian, Armenian chess player
David Minasian, film producer, screenwriter, director, and musician, singer and songwriter
Ruben Ter Minasian, Armenian revolutionary and politician

Minassian

Aram Ter-Minassian, Vice President of Consumer Relations at Capital One Bank
Anahide Ter Minassian, born Anahide Kévonian (1929–2019), French historian of Armenian origin 
Alek Minassian (born 1992), Armenian-Canadian perpetrator of the Toronto van attack
Craig Minassian, chief communications and marketing officer of the Clinton Foundation
Leone Minassian (1905–1978), Ottoman Empire-born Italian painter of Armenian descent.
Levon Minassian, French-Armenian duduk player
Margarita Ervandovna Ter-Minassian (1910–1995), sometimes as Ter-Minasyan or Ter-Minasian, Soviet entomologist
Nicolas Minassian (born 1973), French race driver of Armenian descent
Raphaël Minassian (born 1946), Lebanese-born Armenian Catholic archbishop
Sarkis Minassian (1873–1915), also known as Aram Ashod,  Armenian journalist, writer, and political activist

Armenian-language surnames